This is a list of the candidates for the offices of President of the United States and Vice President of the United States of the Republican Party, either duly preselected and nominated, or the presumptive nominees of a future preselection and election. Opponents who received over one percent of the popular vote or ran an official campaign that received Electoral College votes are listed. Offices held prior to Election Day are included, and those held on Election Day have an italicized end date.

19th century

1856

1860, 1864

1868, 1872

1876

1880

1884

1888, 1892

1896, 1900

20th century

1904

1908, 1912

1916

1920

1924

1928, 1932

1936

1940

1944, 1948

1952, 1956

1960

1964

1968, 1972

1976

1980, 1984

1988, 1992

1996

21st century

2000, 2004

2008

2012

2016, 2020

See also
List of Republican National Conventions
History of the United States Republican Party
List of United States National Republican/Whig Party presidential tickets
List of United States Democratic Party presidential tickets
List of United States Green Party presidential tickets
List of United States Libertarian Party presidential tickets

Notes

 
 
Republican
Presidential tickets